Shakuvaa is a Maldivian television series directed by Bahaulla Ibrahim. It stars Ahmed Easa, Nathasha Jaleel, Nuzuhath Shuaib and Mohamed Athik in main roles. The pilot episode of the series was released on 7 April 2022. The series consisting of five episodes, focuses on the conflicts and choices of a confused husband.

Cast and characters

Main
 Ahmed Easa as Adheel
 Nathasha Jaleel as Amira
 Nuzuhath Shuaib as Rindha
 Mohamed Athik as Ziyan
 Mohamed Afrah as Siraj

Guest
 Hussain Nazim as Amira's friend (Episode 5)

Episodes

Soundtrack

Release and reception
The first episode of the series was released on 7 April 2022 through Television Maldives, on the occasion of Ramadan 1443. The series received mixed to positive reviews from critics and viewers.

References

Serial drama television series
Maldivian television shows